Thomas Herman Griffith (October 26, 1889 – April 13, 1967) was an American professional baseball player from 1913 to 1925. He was a right fielder who mainly played with the Cincinnati Reds and Brooklyn Robins. While with these teams he never hit below .250 and had over 100 hits in a season eight times.

Griffith, who was born in Prospect, Ohio, also played briefly for the Boston Braves and Chicago Cubs.

In 1401 games played, Griffith batted .280 (1383-4947) with 589 runs, 52 home runs and 619 RBI over a 13-year major-league career. His on-base percentage was .328 and slugging percentage was .382. He appeared in the 1920 World Series, batting .190 (4-21) with one run scored and three RBI for the Brooklyn Robins. He had three 5-hit games in his MLB career, all as a member of the Robins. He surpassed the .300 batting mark three times. His career fielding percentage as an outfielder was .956.

He died in Cincinnati, Ohio.

References

1889 births
1967 deaths
Major League Baseball outfielders
Baseball players from Cincinnati
Cincinnati Reds players
Brooklyn Robins players
Boston Braves players
Chicago Cubs players
People from Marion County, Ohio
New Bedford Whalers (baseball) players
Indianapolis Indians players
Little Rock Travelers players
Atlanta Crackers players